Cannabis in Panama  is illegal for recreational use,  but the law is often unenforced and its use is often tolerated by the general public. Its use is regarded as a taboo subject and it may be masked by the addition of food flavorings. It is often consumed by the youth and cannabis extracts are sometimes used in e-cigarettes.  

Medical cannabis was legalized in 2021, after a bill passed the national assembly by a unanimous vote and was signed into law by President Laurentino Cortizo in October. Panama became the first Central American country to legalize medical cannabis in doing so.

Prohibition
The cultivation and use of cannabis (kan-jac) was banned in Panama in 1923.

Terminology
The Panamanian 1935 Judicial Register refers to cannabis being commonly known locally as "Canyac" or "Kan Jac".

References